The 1886 Staten Island Football Club football team was an American football team that represented four athletic clubs, the Staten Island Cricket, Rowing, and Athletic clubs, as well as the Clifton Athletic Club during the 1886 football season. The team compiled a  record and played its home games at St. George Cricket Grounds in Hoboken, New Jersey. The Staten Islanders were able to comply with the AFU's system of playing any other league opponents twice, but were forced to disqualify their November 6th match with the Crickets as a conference win because of some controversial officiating.

Schedule

References

Staten Island Football Club
Staten Island Football Club